Energy Park is a large mixed-use project in Saint Paul, Minnesota's Midway district that began in 1982. The area is bounded by Lexington Parkway on the east, BNSF (former Great Northern) railroad tracks on the south, Snelling Avenue on the west, and BNSF (former Northern Pacific) tracks on the north. It has industrial, commercial, and residential uses. Though not typical of any projects in the Twin Cities, Energy Park is a quintessential 1980s development activity. 

Saint Paul planners formed plans to transform over 200 acres of largely disused railroad land in the heart of the city into an asset. Energy Park was a product of the mid 1970s energy crisis and was intended as a model urban environment focused on energy conservation. The intention was for the buildings to be energy efficient and for people to live and work within the area, mostly in energy-related jobs. These intentions had little success, resulting in some critics considering the Energy Park a failure. In 1980, the project received $12.1 million from the federal government as an Urban Development Action Grants.

The first years of the project weren't very successful. Planning and start-up took much longer than municipal officials anticipated, and the apparent end of the energy crisis undermined the premise behind the "model urban environment". The Bandana Square, the project's retail center, seemed to be a failure. The condominiums didn't sell well. Job growth, industrial tenants, housing construction did not meet the expectations outlined in the plans.

By 1985, the Energy Park saw more prosperity, and in 1989, it was described as "plainly a success". The first two phases of housing construction were completed and largely occupied. The industrial space was filling in, although not all employment was energy related. Bandana Square seemed prosperous. The center would later be turned over to the Saint Paul Port Authority after it lost the Wilder Foundation $9 million. 

Factors that contributed to the success of the Energy Park include the Saint Paul Port Authority's economic strength and industrial marketing skills; the Planning Economic Development's staff creativity in packaging the deal and obtaining substantial and extraordinary federal aid; the involvements of the non-profit Wilder Foundation in the housing and retail development, in cooperation with the Department of Planning Economic Development; the inclusion of representatives from several district councils in the project's planning; the flexibility of various agencies - including their ability to adapt to the loss of the project's original theme; and finally, George Latimer's leadership as mayor. The Wilder Foundation invested $35 million in Energy Park retail, housing and office developments.

The Minnesota Children's Museum was located in the neighborhood from 1985 to 1995.

See also
Bandana Square

References

External links
Saint Paul Port Authority website

Business parks of the United States
Neighborhoods in Saint Paul, Minnesota